
Gmina Dzikowiec is a rural gmina (administrative district) in Kolbuszowa County, Subcarpathian Voivodeship, in south-eastern Poland.

Villages
Gmina Dzikowiec contains the villages and settlements of Dzikowiec, Kopcie, Lipnica, Mechowiec, Nowy Dzikowiec, Osia Góra, Płazówka and Wilcza Wola.

Neighbouring gminas
Gmina Dzikowiec is bordered by the gminas of Bojanów, Cmolas, Jeżowe, Kolbuszowa, Majdan Królewski and Raniżów.

References
Polish official population figures 2006

Dzikowiec
Kolbuszowa County